Chiangrai Province Stadium or Chiangrai Provincial Administrative Organization Stadium is a multi-purpose stadium in Chiang Rai Province, Thailand. It is currently used mostly for football matches and is the home stadium of Chiangrai City. The stadium holds 5,000 people.

Multi-purpose stadiums in Thailand
Buildings and structures in Chiang Rai province
Sport in Chiang Rai province